The 1996 U.S. Open was the 96th U.S. Open, held June 13–16 at Oakland Hills Country Club in Birmingham, Michigan, a suburb northwest of Detroit. Steve Jones won his only major title, one stroke ahead of runners-up Tom Lehman and Davis Love III.

Jones went through an incredible journey just to get to Oakland Hills. He had won four PGA Tour events, the last in 1989, but in November 1991 he was involved in a dirt bike accident that threatened to end his career. He separated his shoulder and sprained an ankle, as well as suffering ligament damage in his left ring finger. Jones was sidelined for three years, not making it back on tour until 1994. His win here came in his first U.S. Open since 1991, and he was the first champion to go through sectional qualifying since tour rookie Jerry Pate in 1976. After this win, Jones won three additional events on tour.

This was the eighth major championship at the South Course, which previously hosted the U.S. Open in 1924, 1937, 1951, 1961, and 1985, and the PGA Championship in 1972 and 1979.  It later hosted the PGA Championship in 2008.

It was Lehman's third close call in a major (1994 Masters, 1995 U.S. Open); he regrouped and won the next, The Open Championship in England. Love won the PGA Championship the following year at Winged Foot.

Course layout

South Course 

Lengths of the course for previous majors:

Past champions in the field 

All ten former champions in the field made the cut.

Round summaries

First round
Thursday, June 13, 1996

Second round
Friday, June 14, 1996

Amateurs: Scott (+4), Woods (+5), Kuehne (+8), Leen (+8), Hobby (+10), Edstrom (+14).

Third round
Saturday, June 15, 1996

Final round
Sunday, June 16, 1996

In the final pairing, Tom Lehman had a three-stroke lead over Steve Jones after eight holes, but bogeyed 10 and 12 and Jones led by two strokes with six holes remaining. Tied at the 18th tee, Lehman drove into a bunker and missed a  putt to save par. Davis Love III made a charge, recording birdies at 11, 12, and 15; he bogeyed the final two holes, missing a 3-footer (0.9 m) for par at the last. John Morse came to the 18th tee at 1-under needing a birdie to tie Jones and Lehman for the lead; he hit the green in two on the par-4 finishing hole, but 3-putted from 30 feet to finish at even par for the tournament and end up alone in fourth place.

Amateurs: Leen (+11), Kuehne (+13), Woods (+14), Scott (+21)

Scorecard

Cumulative tournament scores, relative to par

Source:

References

External links
USGA Championship Database
USOpen.com – 1996

U.S. Open (golf)
Golf in Michigan
Bloomfield Hills, Michigan
U.S. Open (golf)
U.S. Open (golf)
U.S. Open (golf)
U.S. Open (golf)